MicL RNA (mRNA-interfering complementary RNA regulator of Lpp) is a  σ E transcription factor-dependent small non-coding RNA. It was discovered in E. coli.  Together with MicA and RybB sRNAs, MicL sRNA down-regulates the synthesis of abundant outer membrane proteins in response to stress. MicL specifically targets mRNA of lipoprotein Lpp, preventing its translation.

References 

Non-coding RNA
RNA
RNA-binding proteins